The following highways or routes are numbered 999.

Canada
Saskatchewan Highway 999

Israel
 Route 999 (Israel)

Netherlands
 N999 (Netherlands)

United States
  (former)
 
 
 Puerto Rico Highway 999 (former)